Spirit is the 11th studio album by John Denver. It was released in August, 1976. After the full-blown success of Windsong and its accompanying hit singles, this album began a downward chart trend for the singer, although he continued to have hits on the adult contemporary charts. "Baby, You Look Good to Me Tonight" reached #65 on the U.S. Billboard Hot 100, as well as reaching the Top 40 on the U.S. and Canadian Country and AC charts.

This album was re-released with bonus tracks.

Track listing

Side one
 "Come and Let Me Look in Your Eyes" (Denver, Joe Henry) - 3:47
 "Eli's Song" (Jack Williams) - 3:58
 "Wrangle Mountain Song" (Denver) - 3:10
 "Hitchhiker" (Denver, Steve Weisberg) - 3:10
 "In the Grand Way" (John Sommers) - 3:39
 "Polka Dots and Moonbeams" (Johnny Burke, Jimmy Van Heusen) - 3:08

Side two
 "It Makes Me Giggle" (Denver) - 3:16
 "Baby, You Look Good to Me Tonight" (Bill Danoff) - 2:45
 "Like a Sad Song" (Denver) - 3:41
 "San Antonio Rose" (Bob Wills) - 2:40
 "Pegasus" (Denver, Joe Henry) - 3:20
 "The Wings That Fly Us Home" (Denver, Joe Henry) - 4:11

CD bonus tracks
 "Whose Garden Was This" (Tom Paxton)
 "The Game Is Over" (Denver, Jean Pierre Bourtayre, Jean Marcel Bouchety)
 "Eleanor Rigby" (John Lennon, Paul McCartney)
 "Old Folks" (Jacques Brel, Gerard Jouannest, Jean Corti, Eric Blau, Mort Shuman)
 Medley: "Golden Slumbers" (John Lennon, Paul McCartney); "Sweet Sweet Life" (Denver); "Tremble If You Must" (Paul Potash)

These bonus tracks were originally released in 1970 as Side 2 of the Whose Garden Was This album.

Personnel
John Denver – guitars, vocals
Steve Weisberg – electric and acoustic guitars, dobro, pedal steel guitar, backing vocals
Hal Blaine – drums, percussion
Dick Kniss – bass
John Sommers – acoustic guitar, banjo, fiddle, backing vocals
All songs arranged by John Denver, Dick Kniss, Steve Weisberg, John Sommers and Hal Blaine
Lee Holdridge – orchestral arrangements, conductor
Starland Vocal Band - backing vocals on "Baby, You Look Good to Me Tonight" and "Polka Dots and Moonbeams"
Children's Choir on "Pegasus" from St. Mel's School, Woodland Hills, California
Technical
Milton Okun – Producer
Kris O'Connor – Assistant producer
Richard Simpson – Mastering Engineer
Mickey Crofford – Engineer
Artie Torgersen – Assistant Engineer
Lynne Morse – A&R Coordination
Jerry Weintraub – Personal management
Source: Notes on original "Spirit" Album Sleeve 1976 RCA Records, NY

Charts

References

John Denver albums
1976 albums
Albums arranged by Lee Holdridge
Albums produced by Milt Okun
RCA Records albums